Gloucester Docks is an historic area of the city of Gloucester. The docks are located at the northern junction of the River Severn with the Gloucester and Sharpness Canal. They are Britain's most inland port.

The docks include fifteen Victorian warehouses, that are now listed buildings. It also contains the Gloucester Waterways Museum and the Soldiers of Gloucestershire Museum. The Robert Opie Collection of Advertising and Packaging was also here from 1984 until 2001.

References

External links 

 
Docks
Ports and harbours of Gloucestershire
Industrial history of Gloucestershire